The Our Moldova Alliance (AMN) was a social-liberal political party in Moldova led by Serafim Urechean, former mayor of Chișinău. It merged into the Liberal Democratic Party of Moldova (PLDM) during April 2011.

History
The Our Moldova Alliance was established as a party in 2003 from the merger of:

the Social Democratic Alliance of Moldova or the Braghiș Alliance, successor of the social-political Movement "Civic Alliance for Reforms" and the Party of Social Democracy "Furnica" (Ant), was a social-democratic party established in 1997 and adopted this name in 2001. It was led by Dumitru Braghiș and absorbed the Socio-political Movement "Plai Natal" in 2002.
the Liberal Party, a liberal party created as a merger of the Party of Rebirth and Conciliation of Moldova (1995), National Peasant Christian Democratic Party (1993) and the Social Liberal Union "Force of Moldova", the latter was being a merger of the National Liberal Party (1993) and the Social-Political Movement "For Order and Justice" (2000). Among its leaders was former president Mircea Snegur. The last party leader was Veaceslav Untila.
the Independents' Alliance of Moldova, a party founded in 2001 by Serafim Urechean, mayor of Chișinău.
the Popular Democratic Party of Moldova, a party established in 1997.

Moldovan parliamentary election, 2005
At the 2005 parliamentary elections, on 6 March 2005, the party was part of the Democratic Moldova Electoral Bloc with the Democratic Party of Moldova (PDM) and Social Liberal Party (PSL), which won 28.4% of the popular vote and 34 out of 101 seats. After the elections the bloc fell apart in three parliamentary groups of the constituent parties, so the Alliance formed a separate group with 23 deputies until the 2009 elections, when they won fewer seats.

Moldovan parliamentary election, 2009
At the April 2009 parliamentary elections, the Our Moldova Alliance won 11 seats. With the other opposition parties, it participated in the successful blocking of the election of a presidential candidate from the Party of Communists of the Republic of Moldova (PCRM) during the May–June 2009 presidential election, which led to new elections. At the July 2009 parliamentary election, the Our Moldova Alliance lost 4 seats, receiving a total of 7 seats. However, other opposition parties gained enough seats for a majority and the PCRM was defeated. In August 2009, the party became a political force within the Alliance For European Integration. The party lost all parliamentary representation in the 2010 parliamentary election.

Notable members

Vasile Balan
Leonid Bujor
Valentin Chepteni
Mihai Cimpoi
Vladimir Ciobanu
Ivan Ciontoloi
Iurie Colesnic
Vasile Colța
Valeriu Cosarciuc
Nicolai Deatovschi
Vasile Grozav
Ion Guțu
Lidia Guțu
Alexandru Oleinic
Victor Osipov
Vasile Pîntea
Veaceslav Platon
Ion Pleșca
Mihail Silistraru
Anatol Țăranu
Veaceslav Untilă
Serafim Urechean

See also
Liberalism
Contributions to liberal theory
Liberalism worldwide
List of liberal parties
Liberal democracy
Liberalism in Moldova

References

External links
 Official website

Defunct political parties in Moldova
Liberal parties in Moldova
Political parties established in 2003
Political parties disestablished in 2011
Alliance for European Integration
Defunct liberal political parties